Baltic Chain Tour is a stage race for professional road bicycle racers organized as a part of the UCI Continental Circuits. Baltic Chain Tour was established to commemorate Baltic Way. Tour is conducted mainly in the Baltic states of Estonia, Latvia and Lithuania, however in 2013 it started in Lahti, Finland. Baltic Chain Tour is a UCI category 2.2 cycling tour.

The joint Baltic cycling tour has a long history. The tradition began in the 1950s and was broken in 1987. On November 4, 2010 in Riga, the presidents of three national cycling unions signed a cooperation agreement to restore the tradition of the Baltic cycling tour.

Origins 
Although the first international cycling race in the Baltics was held in 1889 from Riga (Latvia) to Tallinn (Estonia), the first Baltic Tour was held in 1955. For its first four years the tour was held in Latvia and Lithuania. Since 1959 the tour has been held in three Baltic countries. For many, it was a preparation for the Peace Race, which usually was held after Baltic Tour. At the time, the tour took place in May. The modern tour is raced in August to commemorate the anniversary of the famous Baltic Way event in 1989. The current record holder for most wins is the Estonian Ants Väravas, who won the race three times – in 1959, 1962 and 1964.

Results

Baltic Tour

Baltic Chain Tour

References

External links 
 
 
 
 

 
Cycle races in Lithuania
Cycle races in Latvia
Cycle races in Estonia
Recurring sporting events established in 2011
2011 establishments in Lithuania
2011 establishments in Estonia
2011 establishments in Latvia
International cycle races hosted by Estonia
Summer events in Estonia
Summer events in Latvia
Summer events in Lithuania
Sport in the Baltic states